The women's 400 metres hurdles at the 2018 European Athletics Championships takes place at the Olympic Stadium on 7, 8 and 10 August.

Records

Schedule

Results

Round 1
First 3 in each heat (Q) and the next fastest 3 (q) advance to the Semifinals. 12 fastest entrants awarded bye to Semifinals.

Semifinals
First 2 (Q) and next 2 fastest (q) qualify for the final.

Final

References

400 metres hurdles W
400 metres hurdles at the European Athletics Championships
Euro